The Víctor M. Blanco Telescope, also known as the Blanco 4m, is a 4-metre aperture telescope located at the Cerro Tololo Inter-American Observatory, Chile. Commissioned in 1974 and completed in 1976, the telescope is identical to the Mayall 4m telescope located on Kitt Peak. In 1995 it was dedicated and named in honour of Puerto Rican astronomer Víctor Manuel Blanco.
It was the largest optical telescope in the Southern hemisphere from 1976 until 1998, when the first 8-metre telescope of the ESO Very Large Telescope opened.

Currently the main research instrument used at the telescope is the Dark Energy Camera (DECam), the camera used in the Dark Energy Survey. DECam saw its first light in September 2012.

The Mosaic II camera was used at this CTIO 4-m telescope in the southern hemisphere since 1999. This was a development of the KNPO Mosaic camera installed in 1998 in the northern hemisphere. These cameras were used for various astronomical surveys, and were noted for their success.

Photos

See also 
 List of largest optical reflecting telescopes
 List of astronomical observatories
 List of largest optical telescopes in the 20th century

References 

Optical telescopes
NOIRLab
Astronomical observatories in Chile
Buildings and structures in Coquimbo Region
1976 establishments in Chile